Postlethwaite is an English surname. Notable people with the surname include:
 Billy Postlethwaite (born 1989), English actor
 Harvey Postlethwaite (1944–1999), British Formula One engineer
 Jane Postlethwaite, British comedian
 Jude Postlethwaite (born 2002), Irish rugby union player
 Lily Postlethwaite (born 2001), Australian rules footballer
 Matt Postlethwaite (born 1996), English rugby union player
 Matthew Postlethwaite (born 1991), British actor
 Pete Postlethwaite (1946–2011), British actor
 Thomas Postlethwaite (1731–1798), English mathematician
 William Postlethwaite (1829–1908), New Zealand politician

See also
 James Postlethwaite, a schooner
 Malachy Postlethwayt (1707–1767), British commercial expert and specialist lexicologist
 Kathy Postlewait (born 1949), American golfer

English-language surnames